is a male Japanese judoka.

His father, Yasuhiro Shichinohe, is a former Kyokushin karate national champion and his mother is Belgian. In childhood, he practiced both judo and karate, but at the age of 13, he chose to focus only on judo. In 2011, after graduating from Fukuoka University, he was employed by Kyushu Electric Power.

He won the silver medal in the heavyweight (+100 kg) division at the 2014 and 2015 World Judo Championships.

References

External links
 

1988 births
Living people
Japanese male judoka
Japanese people of Belgian descent
20th-century Japanese people
21st-century Japanese people